The Cea River is a river of northwestern Spain.  It is an affluent of the Esla River, and its course runs through the provinces of León, Valladolid and Zamora. It is 157 km long. Its source is in the municipality of Prioro, in León province. It rises from a spring called Fuente del Pescado, at the foot of the Peñas Prietas.

See also 
 List of rivers of Spain

Rivers of Spain
Rivers of León, Spain
Rivers of Castile and León
Tributaries of the Esla